Gabat or GABAT may refer to the following :

 Places 
 Gabat, Pyrénées-Atlantiques, commune in SW France
 Gabat State, a former princely state in Mahi Kantha, Gujarat, India
 Gabat village, in Bayad Taluka of Sabarkantha District, Gujarat, seat of the above state

 Other 
 GABAT, mitochondrial γ-aminobutyric acid transaminase